Abortion in Louisiana is illegal in most cases, but decriminalized in the city of New Orleans, as of August 1, 2022. 

Earlier in 2022, a Legislative committee passed to the House floor a proposed law that would have potentially criminalized abortion seekers, as well as abortion providers, which was met with vehement opposition by both pro- and anti-abortion advocates and ultimately amended by the full House to remove criminal sanctions for abortion seekers, passed into law and signed by Governor John Bel Edwards (D).

According to a 2014 Pew Research Center gallup poll, 57% of Louisiana adults said abortion should be illegal in all or most cases with 39% responding that it should be legal.
A 2022 LSU poll found that 49% thought abortion should be illegal in all or most cases, and 46% thought it should be legal. Among Democrats, the rate of support increased from 51% to 74% since a similar poll in 2016, while there was little change among Republicans.

History

Legislative 

By the end of the 1800s, Louisiana was the only state lacking a therapeutic exception in their legislative ban on abortions. In the 19th century, abortion bans by state legislatures centered on protecting the life of the mother given the number of deaths caused by abortions; state governments viewed themselves as looking out for the lives of their citizens.

A 1997 Louisiana law created a civil cause-of-action for abortion-related damages, including damage to the unborn child for up to ten years after the abortion. The same law also bars the state's Patient's Compensation Fund (which limits malpractice liability for participating physicians) from insuring against abortion-related claims. An attorney for the Center for Reproductive Rights, which opposes the law, stated the law is an attempt to drive abortion providers out of practice, and that every completed abortion imposes strict liability under the law because abortion necessarily involves damage to the unborn child.

On June 19, 2006, then-Governor Kathleen Blanco signed into law a trigger ban on most forms of abortion (unless the life or the permanent health of the mother was in danger) once it passed the state legislature. Although she felt exclusions for rape or incest would have "been reasonable", she felt she should not veto the law based on those reasons. The trigger law would only go into effect if the United States Supreme Court reversed Roe v. Wade. Louisiana's measure would allow the prosecution of any person who performed, or aided someone performing an abortion; the penalties for which included up to 10 years in prison and a maximum fine of $100,000.

Louisiana passed a law in the 2000s banning abortions prior to 22 weeks, when it was said that the fetus could feel pain. In 2007, Louisiana was one of 23 states to have a detailed abortion-specific informed-consent requirement. By law, abortion providers in Alabama, Louisiana and Mississippi were required to perform an ultrasound on the pregnant woman prior to providing women with abortion services, despite the fact that in this time period of gestation, an ultrasound has no medical necessity.

In 2011, Louisiana was one of six states with a legislature that introduced a bill (which failed to pass) to ban abortion in almost all cases. In 2013, the state Targeted Regulation of Abortion Providers (TRAP) law applied to private doctor offices in addition to abortion clinics. In 2014, the state passed a law that appeared to require it to maintain a database of women who had abortions in the state and the type of abortion performed. A second law, Act 620, which passed in 2014, was modeled after an earlier Texas law requiring any doctor performing abortions also have admittance privileges at an authorized hospital within a 30-mile radius of the abortion clinic, among other new requirements. At the time the law was passed, only one doctor met the required criteria, effectively leaving only one legal abortion clinic in the state. The state had a law on the books in August 2018 that would be triggered if Roe v. Wade was overturned.

One of the most active years (in terms of trying to pass abortion rights restrictions) for state legislatures across the nation was 2019. Many republican-led states began to push these bills after Brett M. Kavanaugh was confirmed as a US Supreme Court judge, (Kavanaugh replacing the more liberal Anthony M. Kennedy.) These state governments generally saw Kavanaugh's confirmation as a positive sign that moves to restrict abortion rights would less likely face resistance by the courts. In mid-May 2019, Louisiana state law banned abortion after week 22. Shortly thereafter, the Louisiana legislature passed a law making abortion illegal in almost all cases. Louisiana was one of several states passing similar laws in April and May 2019, alongside Georgia, Missouri and Alabama. The bill was created as an amendment, and required voters in the state to pass it via referendum before it could become law. Tehe law was an example of a "fetal heartbeat" bill. At the time the bill passed, 15% of the state legislators were female, with only two female representatives voting against the bill.

In 2020, Louisiana voters passed a measure to amend the state constitution to omit any language implying that a woman has a right to get an abortion or that any abortion that does occur should be funded. This measure was approved by voters in the November 2020 election.

In May 2022, a state House committee voted 7–2 to advance a bill (HB813) that would "amend the definition of 'person' and 'unborn child'" to "fully recognize the human personhood of an unborn child... from the moment of fertilization" and grant the embryo "the right to life" under "the same laws protecting other human beings." This may open the possibility that a woman, not only her physician, could be charged with homicide for having an abortion at any point during gestation, and it could also criminalize the destruction of embryos during IVF. This bill faced bipartisan opposition from lawmakers and some anti-abortion groups. This bill was ultimately amended by the full House to remove criminal sanctions for abortion seekers, and was passed into law and signed by Governor John Bel Edwards (D).

In July 2022, the New Orleans City Council unanimously voted to decriminalize abortion-on-demand.

Judicial 
The US Supreme Court's decision in 1973's Roe v. Wade ruling meant the state could no longer regulate abortion in the first trimester.

The model Texas law passed in 2014 was declared unconstitutional by the Supreme Court in Whole Woman's Health v. Hellerstedt in 2016, as the additional admitting privileges required by Texas law interfered with a woman's right to an abortion per Roe v. Wade. While the Texas law was being challenged, the Louisiana law was challenged by abortion clinics and doctors in the state in June Medical Services, LLC v. Gee; while the District Court ordered an injunction on the law, the Fifth Circuit Appeals Court reversed this decision, allowing the law to come in effect later in 2014. The plaintiffs petitioned the Supreme Court, which granted an emergency stay of the Fifth Circuit's order, pending the result of the pending Texas litigation in Whole Woman's Health. June Medical Services was remanded back to District Court, which found the law to be unconstitutional under Whole Woman's Health. The Fifth Circuit reversed the District's finding and prepared to allow the law to reintroduced by February 4, 2019, differentiating the case from the Texas one as they found the physician had not taken any steps to try to qualify for this allowance. The plaintiffs again petitioned the Supreme Court for an emergency stay of the Fifth Circuit's decision. Justice Samuel Alito granted the stay of the law until February 7, 2019, stating that the Court needed more time to evaluate the request and had made no merits on the ruling of the case. On February 7, 2019, the Supreme Court ruled 5–4, with Justice John Roberts joining the liberal Justices, in reversing the Firth Circuit's order, effectively preventing the law from going into effect.
The Supreme Court overturned Roe v. Wade in Dobbs v. Jackson Women's Health Organization,  later in 2022 which returned the legislative decision to the individual states.

Clinical 

Between 1982 and 1992, the number of abortion clinics in Louisiana decreased by one, going from eighteen in 1982 to seventeen in 1992. In 2014, there were five abortion clinics in the state. In 2014, 92% of the parishes in the state lacked an abortion clinic, leaving 63% of women between the ages of 15-44 without access to an abortion clinic. In 2017, there were two Planned Parenthood clinics (neither of which offered abortion services) in Louisiana whose population of women aged 15-49 at the time was 1,089,684. North Dakota, Wyoming, Mississippi, Louisiana, Kentucky and West Virginia were the only six states as of July 21, 2017, to not have a Planned Parenthood clinic offering abortion services.

Statistics 
Between 1972 and 1974, Louisiana had an illegal-abortion mortality rate of 0.1-0.9 per million women aged 15–44. In 1990, 489,000 women in Louisiana faced the risk of an unintended pregnancy. In 2010, the state had zero publicly-funded abortions. In 2001, Arizona, Florida, Iowa, Louisiana, Massachusetts, and Wisconsin did not provide any residence related data regarding abortions performed in the state to the Centers for Disease Control. In 2013, there were 290 abortions among white women aged 15–19, 640 abortions for black women aged 15–19, zero abortions for Hispanic women aged 15–19, and 60 abortions for women of all other races. In 2014, 57% of adults indicated (in a poll by the Pew Research Center) that abortion should be illegal in all or most cases with only 39% saying it should be legal.

Abortion rights views and activities

Protests 
Louisiana women participated in marches supporting abortion rights as part of a #StoptheBans movement in May 2019.

References 

Louisiana
Healthcare in Louisiana
Women in Louisiana